= Benin–Morocco relations =

Bilateral relations between Benin and Morocco

- Benin: Morocco

Relations between Morocco and Benin, or Benin–Morocco relations, from a part of diplomacy, international relations and the wider politics of Africa. They have been marked by diversified cooperation since the visit of king Mohammad VI to Cotonou in 2004. The embassies of Benin in Morocco and Morocco in Benin serve to structure the interests linking the two countries.

== Relationship ==
=== Diplomatic relation ===
Benin and Morocco invest themselves to strengthen their diplomatic relations. In December 2023, Benin has announced its support for Morocco's territorial integrity in Western Sahara and the initiative of the Autonomy Plan presented by Morocco.
